The Miramar Towers are two  skyscrapers located in Avenida Balboa and Calle Federico Boyd, Panama City. Once, the hotel and residential tower complex were the tallest buildings in Panama at 168 m (551 ft), with 55 floors.

The Miramar Towers generated much controversy locally since their construction has made expansion of Balboa avenue impossible. Other environmental groups also protested the building's blocking of a previously uninterrupted view to the ocean from the steep Federico Boyd boulevard.

See also
List of tallest buildings in Panama City

External links
Emporis.com data page on the Miramar Towers
http://www.georgemoreno.com.pa/miramar-inter-continental.html
https://www.avenidabalboa.com/en/torres-miramar
https://www.skyscrapercenter.com/building/miramar-towers-i/2841

Skyscrapers in Panama City
Hotels in Panama
Skyscraper hotels
Residential skyscrapers in Panama City